Francisco Javier Muñiz (21 December 1795 – 8 April 1871) was an Argentine colonel, legislator, and medical doctor. He treated patients and died during the Great Yellow Fever Epidemic of 1871. He was considered the first important naturalist from Argentina.

Personal life
Francisco Javier Muñiz was born in San Isidro, Buenos Aires Province, Argentina on 21 December 1795.

Early military service and medical school
He studied at the Instituto Médico Militar (Military Medical Institute) beginning in 1814. The institute was founded by Dr. Cosme Argerich to train surgeons for the army. Muñiz graduated as a doctor in 1821 He transferred to the University of Buenos Aires and completed his surgical education in 1824. Muñiz obtained his doctorate in 1844; his dissertation was about the vaccination of indigenous peoples against smallpox. This work made him notable among European scientists. His dissertation followed the article, "A Case of Extensive Scabby Ulcerations, Cured by Vaccination" that he wrote and was published in the London Medical and Surgical Journal in 1833.

Career

Medicine
Muñiz, upon becoming a doctor in 1821, worked as a military doctor under Juan Lavalle at Carmen de Patagones during the campaign to secure land from indigenous people. He began to study the customs of native people at this time.
In 1824 he was transferred to the fort at Chascomús, and began his study of paleontology. General Carlos María de Alvear ordered that he accompany Lavalle and his troops during the 1826 war with Brazil. He was promoted to Army Surgeon Major that year and transferred to Luján in 1828 to be a physician to police and military troops.

Muñiz served the military and became a colonel. During the Paraguayan War, he became director of Corrientes Province area hospitals.

In 1848, Muñiz moved to Buenos Aires to become a professor of the School of Medicine where he taught in the fields of forensic medicine, gynecology and obstetrics. He was dean, or president, of a Buenos Aires medical faculty.

Paleontology
Muñiz was a paleontologist, particularly interested in variances among fossils. Working as a physician at Lujan was of particular paleontological interest because of a famous find in 1788 of the Megatherium, an immense ground sloth. He developed a collection that he intended to be used to create a natural history museum. The artifacts were sent (donated or possibly donated by force) to Juan Manuel de Rosas, the dictator of the Argentine Federation, whose support was required to establish a museum. Rosas, in an attempt to build alliances overseas, sent collected fossils to Jean Henri Dupotet, Rear Admiral of the French Navy. Dupotet then sent them to Paris. In France Muñiz collection ended up in the National Museum of Natural History where they were studied by Paul Gervais.

Apuntes Toggraficos, published in 1847 by Muñiz, contained his topographical notes that discussed the study of fossils in the relative ages of sedimentary strata in areas south of the Buenos Aires Province by naturalists, including Charles Darwin. Darwin began corresponding with Muñiz after reading his work on ñata cattle, indicative of the reputation that he was gaining as a naturalist. Domingo Sarmiento, who researched Muñiz's papers, commented on his influence to Darwin's theory of the origin of species.

He described a sabertooth, which he named Muni-felus Bonaerensis, in Gaceta Mercantil in 1845. He sent his description to Darwin on 30 August 1846 for his comments. Darwin encouraged him to send specimens to France, which were received in Paris, apparently sent by Rosas. It was determined to be a Smilodon bonaerensis.

In their book, From Man to Ape: Darwinism in Argentina, Novoa and Levine identify Muniz as the first important naturalist from Argentina, who donated his later collection of fossils to the Museum of Buenos Aires.

Politics
He was a legislator, elected first as a representative and then a senator.

Death

After having treated people with yellow fever during the great Buenos Aires epidemic, Muñiz succumbed to the illness and died on 8 April 1871. He was buried in the Cementerio de la Recoleta in Buenos Aires, Argentina. A monument was created in his honor by the city of Buenos Aires.

Legacy
 Of his importance to Argentina, President Sarmiento wrote:

 The Museo de Historia Natural "Francisco Javier Muñiz" de Moreno was inaugurated in Moreno Partido in 1999 in his honor.
 In a series commemorating scientists, Argentina issued a stamp with a portrait of Francisco Javier Muñiz in 1966.
 Hospital Muñiz, the oldest Infectious Diseases Hospital in Latin America, is named in his honor.

Notes

References

Further reading
 Babini, José, La Ciencia en la Argentina. Biblioteca de América, libros del tiempo nuevo. EUDEBA, 1963. (Spanish)
 Chávez, Fermín, La cultura en la época de Rosas, Bs. As., 1991. (Spanish)
 Gómez, Leila, "Francisco Javier Muniz, The Muni-Felis Bonaerensis". Darwinism in Argentina: Major Texts (1845–1909). Lexington Books. pp. 41–48, 2012. . (English)
 Nicolau, Juan Carlos, Ciencia y técnica en Buenos Aires 1800–1860. Ed. EUDEBA, Bs. As., 2005.  (Spanish)

1795 births
1871 deaths
People from San Isidro, Buenos Aires
Argentine people of Spanish descent
Members of the Buenos Aires Province Chamber of Deputies
Argentine physicians
Argentine naturalists
Argentine paleontologists
Argentine colonels
University of Buenos Aires alumni
Academic staff of the University of Buenos Aires
People of the Cisplatine War
Argentine military personnel of the Paraguayan War
Deaths from yellow fever
Burials at La Recoleta Cemetery